Piggabeen is a town located in north-eastern New South Wales, Australia, in the Tweed Shire.

Once predominantly a dairy farming town Piggabeen now mainly consists of acreage homesites and small hobby farms. Piggabeen has a valley that leads northwest towards the Queensland border. Piggabeen and its valley are part of the Tweed Shield Volcano and Caldera that is the largest erosion caldera in the southern hemisphere, with Mount Warning being the extinct volcano. Landmarks located in Piggabeen include the Old Piggabeen Hall and School that were both established in 1919, Piggabeen Creek, as well as Campbell Hill, (formerly Mount Campbell).

The Aboriginal meaning for Piggabeen (Valley of the Palms) is Bundjulung Piccabeen or bigibin for the Bangalow palms.

Demographics

The median age of the Piggabeen population was 42 years, 5 years above the national median of 37.

78.9% of people living in Piggabeen were born in Australia. The other top responses for country of birth were England 6.4%, New Zealand 5.5%, United States of America 0.9%.

93% of people spoke only English at home; the next most common language was 0.9% Maltese.

References 

Suburbs of Tweed Heads, New South Wales